RCET may refer to:

Rachna College of Engineering and Technology, a college in Gujranwala, Punjab, Pakistan
Raja College of Engineering and Technology, a college in Madurai, Tamil Nadu, India
Royal College of Engineering & Technology, a college in Thrissur, Kerala, India
Rungta College of Engineering and Technology, a college in Bhilai, Chhattisgarh, India